The gray tree frog (Hyla versicolor) is a small arboreal frog in the family Hylidae native to much of the eastern United States and southeastern Canada.

Gray tree frog may also refer to:

 Cope's gray tree frog (Hyla chrysoscelis), a frog in the family Hylidae found in the United States
 Gray foam-nest tree frog (Chiromantis xerampelina), a frog in the family Rhacophoridae found in Sub-Saharan Africa

Animal common name disambiguation pages